The Starleague, or the Ongamenet Starleague (OSL), was a professional South Korean StarCraft individual league run by Ongamenet. It first ran StarCraft: Brood War competitions but transitioned to StarCraft II: Wings of Liberty after that game's release. The Starleague was broadcast on Korean cable television. The league folded after the 2012 season.

History of Starleague

Starleague started out as a program on Tooniverse, following the immense popularity of StarCraft in Korea, and the success of broadcast-gaming on other Korean channels.  In 2000, Starleague was spun off into a gaming-dedicated channel, OnGameNet.

Starleague started out modestly, with a small prize sum and a few cult followers.  In its seven-year history, it has evolved into a major sport in Korea, with more viewers than most other professional sports. Recently in the related Proleague finals, 120,000 fans came out to watch the match between SK Telecom T1 and KT Rolster.  Finals for Starleague now regularly attract more than 50,000 fans, and viewed nationwide on television by millions.  Famous gamers like Lim Yo Hwan (Boxer) have more than 500,000 registered fans.  Pro gamers are organized into teams supported by major Korean firms, and prizes, contracts, and endorsements are now huge in comparison to even 3 or 4 years ago.

Starleague started to attract major attention with the rise of the "Boxer Terran" in the HanbitSoft Starleague in 2001.  Professional gamer Lim Yo Hwan swept the scene with a 3:0 victory against Jang Jin Nam, using a rare race at the time (Terran) and using the Terran dropship.  Boxer continued to win the next league, Coca-Cola Starleague, against Hong Jin-Ho (Yellow), and ended up 2nd to Kim Dong Soo (Garimto) in the 2001 Sky Starleague. By this time, first-prize was 20,000,000 Korean Won, about US$20,000.

Starleague became so popular that it began to attract several foreign players, including Elky (Bertrand Grospellier) from France and Grrrr... (Guillaume Patry) from Canada.

Starleague started to gain its own "color" with the 2003 MyCube Starleague, with a distinctive red, black, and white emblem and a much more polished opening computer-generated cinematic.  Prize money by this time was more than double the amount in the 2001 Coca-Cola championships, and regular games started to attract more people, with a refurbishing of the Ongamenet studio.

In the start of 2003, with the rise of pro gaming teams and their popularity, Ongamenet decided to create a spin-off of the Starleague, simply named 'Proleague', in which pro teams play against each other for the championship title. These pro leagues go at least twice as long as a normal Starleague.

The winner of 3 OSLs receives a special award called "The Golden Mouse". Until this day 4 players have accomplished that: Lee Yun Yeol (NaDa), winner of the 2002 Panasonic Starleague, 2004 IOPS Starleague, and 2006 Shinhan Bank Starleague; Park Sung-Joon (JulyZerg), winner of the 2004 Gillette Starleague, 2005 EVER Starleague, and 2008 EVER Starleague; Lee Jae Dong (Jaedong), winner of the 2007 EVER Starleague, 2009 Batoo Starleague, and 2009 Bacchus Starleague; and most recently Lee Young-Ho (Flash), winner of the 2008 Bacchus Starleague, winner of the 2009 EVER Starleague, and 2010 Korean Air 2 Starleague.  Winners of 5 OSLs and 7 OSLs will receive the "Platinum Mouse" and the "Diamond Mouse," respectively.  No player has achieved this as of today.

On June 5, 2012, it was officially announced that the 34th Starleague, TVing Starleague, will be the last Starleague that uses StarCraft: Brood War. It was announced that the next Starleague will be held using StarCraft II: Wings of Liberty.

StarCraft: BroodWar League Champions

StarCraft II: Wings of Liberty League Champions

Only one OSL was run during the lifespan of Wings of Liberty due to OGN's late switch to StarCraft II.

StarCraft II: Heart of the Swarm League Champions

League Brackets

2009 Bacchus OSL

2009 Ever OSL

2010 Korean Air OSL

2010 Korean Air OSL Season 2

2010 Bacchus OSL

2011 Jin Air OSL

2012 tving OSL

See also
StarCraft professional competition
MBCgame Starleague

External links
OnGameNet

Esports competitions in South Korea
StarCraft competitions
2000 establishments in South Korea
2012 disestablishments in South Korea